Václav Barák (born 22 October 1990) is a retired Czech hurdler.

Internationally he finished seventh at the 2013 Universiade and also competed in the 4 × 400 metres relay at the 2012 World Indoor Championships without reaching the final.

He became Czech champion in the 400 m hurdles in 2012 and 2013, and his personal best time is 49.95 seconds, achieved at the 2013 national championships in Tábor.

References

1990 births
Living people
Czech male hurdlers
Competitors at the 2013 Summer Universiade